Todo Tiene Su Hora (Everything Has Its Time) is the 13th studio album by Dominican singer-songwriter Juan Luis Guerra and his band 4.40. It was released on November 11, 2014, by Capitol Latin and was produced by  Juan Luis Guerra & Janina Rosado. Like his previous albums, The album is composed by variety of tropical music genres such as Bachata, Merengue, Salsa and Son but different instrumentation used normally in classical music such as strings, violins. Guerra described the album as "innovative" and explored lyrics raging from love and romance to social conscience and protest against political corruption. The record encompassed elements of funk and Jazz with merengue  and classical music with bachata.

Todo Tiene Su Hora met with critical acclaim by the critics.  It won three awards at the 16th Annual Latin Grammy Awards including Album of the Year and receive a nomination for Best Tropical Latin Album at the 58th Annual Grammy Awards. In 2016, it was nominated for Album of the Year at the Lo Nuestro Awards 2016 and Tropical Album of the Year at the 2015 Latin Billboard Music Awards. The album was supported by three oficial singles: Tus Besos, Todo Tiene Su Hora and Muchachita Linda.

Todo Tiene Su Hora debut at the top of US Billboard Top Latin Albums and Tropical Albums. Also it debuted at number 65 of Billboard 200 and charted at the Top 20 in Spain and Argentina. It was certified platinum and gold in Colombia, Peru, Costa Rica, Spain and Central America. The album sold nearly half million of copies. To promote the album, Guerra embarked on the commercially successful world concert tour titled Todo Tiene Su Hora Tour.

Background 
On December 12, 2013, Guerra wrapped up his A Son de Guerra Tour in Zapopan, Mexico. In Early 2014, the recording sessions for the album began. On April 21, 2014, it was reveled to the press had a collaboration included at Luis Fonsi album 8. Eventually, the track titled "Llegaste tu" was released on August 30, 2014. On August 26, 2014, the first single "Tus Besos" was oficial released. Later, on September 6, 2014, the title was released to the press and social media. According to Guerra himself, it was the best album that he had recorded so far. On October 10, 2014, he revealed the cover of the album and at 14 of the same month the album set to be preordered on iTunes. Also, it was announced that Guerra had signed an exclusive contract with Universal Music Publishing Group. On October 15, 2014, Guerra revealed by surprise through social media, that he had recorded a song "Moca a Paris" with merengue legendary artist Jhonny Ventura.

Reception

Commercial performance 
In the United States, The album debuted at number 65 on the U.S. Billboard 200 and at number one on the Billboard Top Latin Albums chart, selling 6,000 copies in its first week. In Spain, the album peaked at number 16 on the Spanish Albums Chart and received an album gold certification by the PROMISCAE. In Argentina, the album reached the top 20. It just two days of been released the album reached the top 10 on iTunes in 20 territories. It sold 400,000 copies worldwide.

Critical reception 
AllMusic gave the album a positive review and wrote that "Todo Tiene Su Hora is as consistent as it is adventurous; it ranks easily among Guerra's finest recordings, and reveals that even after 30 years, he is able to break new ground while remaining readily accessible to longtime fans".

Credits and personnel 
The following credits are from AllMusic and from the Todo Tiene Su Hora liner notes:

Juan Luis Guerra y 440

Additional personnel

Track listing

Charts

Weekly charts

Year-end charts

Sales and certifications

See also
List of number-one Billboard Latin Albums from the 2010s
List of number-one Billboard Tropical Albums from the 2010s

References

2014 albums
Juan Luis Guerra albums
Capitol Latin albums
Spanish-language albums
Universal Music Latin Entertainment albums
Latin Grammy Award for Best Contemporary Tropical Album
Latin Grammy Award winners for Album of the Year